In English folklore, elf-arrows, elf-bolts and pixie arrows were names given to discovered arrowheads of flint, used in hunting and war by the Pre-Indo-Europeans of the British Isles and of Europe generally. The name derives from the folklore belief that the arrows fell from the sky, and were used by the elves to kill cattle and inflict elf-shot on human beings.

Elfshot or elf-shot is a medical condition described in Anglo-Saxon medical texts (notably ) believed to be caused by elves shooting invisible elf-arrows at a person or animal (most often cattle), causing sudden shooting pains localized to a particular area of the body.  Modern diagnoses might include rheumatism, arthritis, muscle stitches or cramps. The Old English spell , "if a horse is elf-shot," meaning some kind of internal injury, may be an allusion to the magical elf-shot. However, the term , which describes the internal pain from jaundice or a disorder of bile, is perhaps a more suitable fit. The notion of an elf causing the pain by shooting an arrow is not supported in the sources, although there is evidence of belief that a pain could be caused by an elf, with a possibility of a charm being used for exorcism. It was associated both with Neolithic flint arrowheads and the temptations of the Devil. Possible prevention or curing of elf-shot included visiting Church on the first Sunday of the season, or using a charm made of feverfew, red nettles, and waybread. All have vaguely spear-shaped leaves, which, by the Law of Similarity, may have suggested their use as a remedy for pains attributed to elf-arrows. When dealing with cattle, a sewing-needle folded into a page torn from a psalm-book, and placed into the beast's hair, was an option as well.

When not fired by elves, there exist historical claims of witches firing them as well; these elf-arrows were allegedly given to witches by the Devil, who asked them to fire them - with their thumb, as opposed to a bow - in his name.

Belief in, or mentions of, elf-shot persisted into the 20th century, in Scotland, though more modern elves seem to have concentrated their attentions on animals.

Elf-arrows were sometimes worn as amulets, occasionally set in silver, as a charm against witchcraft.

See also
Arrowhead
Fairy riding – paralysis in livestock, attributed to fairies
Projectile point – component of any projectile weapon, including arrows and spears
Thunderstone (folklore) – flint arrowheads once thought to have fallen from the sky

References 

Old English medicine
English folklore